Lima is a town in Beaverhead County, Montana, United States. The population was 212 at the 2020 census.

Description
The community was named after Lima, Ohio, the native home of an early settler. The post office was established in 1881 under postmaster L. Eugene Simmons. The town, originally named Allerdice, became Spring Hill and finally Lima in 1889.

Geography

Lima is located at  (44.635813, -112.592058). Lima is exit 15 on Interstate 15. Red Rock River runs near the town.

Climate
According to the Köppen Climate Classification system, Lima has a cold semi-arid climate, abbreviated "BSk" on climate maps.

Demographics

2010 census
As of the census of 2010, there were 221 people, 106 households, and 63 families residing in the town. The racial makeup of the town was 94.1% White, 0.9% African American, 0.9% Native American, 0.9% Pacific Islander, 0.5% from other races, and 2.7% from two or more races. Hispanic or Latino of any race were 3.6% of the population.

There were 106 households, of which 23.6% had children under the age of 18 living with them, 49.1% were married couples living together, 6.6% had a female householder with no husband present, 3.8% had a male householder with no wife present, and 40.6% were non-families. 38.7% of all households were made up of individuals, and 11.3% had someone living alone who was 65 years of age or older. The average household size was 2.08 and the average family size was 2.75.

The median age in the town was 51.8 years. 23.5% of residents were under the age of 18; 2.8% were between the ages of 18 and 24; 13.7% were from 25 to 44; 34.8% were from 45 to 64; and 25.3% were 65 years of age or older. The gender makeup of the town was 52.9% male and 47.1% female.

2000 census
As of the census of 2000, there were 242 people, 109 households, and 64 families residing in the town. The population density was 438.7 people per square mile (169.9/km2). There were 158 housing units at an average density of 286.4 per square mile (110.9/km2). The racial makeup of the town was 92.98% White, 2.89% Native American, 1.65% from other races, and 2.48% from two or more races. Hispanic or Latino of any race were 1.65% of the population.

There were 109 households, out of which 22.9% had children under the age of 18 living with them, 53.2% were married couples living together, 3.7% had a female householder with no husband present, and 40.4% were non-families. 34.9% of all households were made up of individuals, and 13.8% had someone living alone who was 65 years of age or older. The average household size was 2.22 and the average family size was 2.94.

In the town, the population was spread out, with 25.6% under the age of 18, 2.5% from 18 to 24, 24.8% from 25 to 44, 24.4% from 45 to 64, and 22.7% who were 65 years of age or older. The median age was 44 years. For every 100 females there were 103.4 males. For every 100 females age 18 and over, there were 93.5 males.

The median income for a household in the town was $20,313, and the median income for a family was $28,438. Males had a median income of $22,083 versus $17,500 for females. The per capita income for the town was $13,163. About 20.6% of families and 26.8% of the population were below the poverty line, including 47.4% of those under the age of eighteen and 11.9% of those 65 or over.

Education
Lima School District educates students from kindergarten through 12th grade. The school mascot is the Bears. Lima High School is a Class C school (less than 108 students) which helps determine athletic competitions.

See also

 List of municipalities in Montana

References

External links

Towns in Beaverhead County, Montana